Offo, Irish monk and founder of Schuttern Abbey, Germany, fl. 603.

Tradition relates that Offo was an Irishman, and a wandering monk. In the year 603 he founded what was then known as Offoniscella ("cell of Offo"). It later became known as Schuttern Abbey.

See also

Other notable Irish people in Germany included:

 Erhard of Regensburg, Bishop of Regensburg, fl. 684. 
 Minnborinus of Cologne, Abbot, fl. 974-986.
 Marianus Scotus, chronicler, died c. 1083.
 Tomás Ó Caiside, friar, soldier, and poet, c.1709-1773?
 Nina Hynes, singer-songwriter

References 
Galioto, Luisa, 2004. Die Abtei Schuttern: vom Stützpunkt zur monastischen Durchdringung der Ortenau zum repräsentativen und kulturellen Zentrum in Die Ortenau 84, 2004, pp. 253–266.
Lacroix, Dr, Emil / Niester, Dr. Heinrich, 1959 edn. Kunstwanderungen in Baden, p. 190. Stuttgart: Chr. Belser Verlag.

7th-century Irish abbots
Irish Christian monks
Irish expatriates in Germany